The Camrose Trophy or "The Camrose" is an annual bridge competition among open teams representing the home nations of Great Britain and Ireland: England (EBU), Northern Ireland (NIBU), Republic of Ireland (CBAI), Scotland (SBU) and Wales (WBU). As such it is the open teams-of-four component of the "Home Internationals" organised by Bridge Great Britain.

The competition was first held in 1937, but it did not become the Camrose until the following year, when Lord Camrose, owner of The Daily Telegraph, donated the trophy. The original trophy has been lost and replaced. Because of World War II the series was interrupted mid-way in 1939 and not resumed until 1946, yet the Camrose is the world's most-played international bridge series.

Beside "The Camrose" (Open flight), the Home Bridge Internationals include annual series for Women from 1950, Juniors from 1971, Under-19 from 1990, and Seniors from 2008.

Structure
Since 2007 there have been six rather than five teams in the competition, to avoid having one team sit out each round. From 2007 to 2009 the sixth team was the defending champion, so there were two teams from the previous year's winning nation. England's second team won in 2009, when it was the final-round host by coincidence. Since then by design the sixth team is a second team from the final-round host nation, which follows a five-year cycle from Northern Ireland in 2010 to England in 2014. That second representative is named for the national bridge federation; thus "Wales" and "Welsh Bridge Union" both entered in 2011.

Since 2005 a double round-robin is scheduled on two weekends. With six teams, each weekend comprises five rounds of three head-to-head matches, a single round-robin. So every team plays 320 deals in the entire event, 64 against each of its rivals. Before 2005, the teams played head-to-head matches over five weekends.

Before 2007 there were simply five national teams, or four during the 48-year absence by the Republic of Ireland from 1951 to 1998.

Results
England won both of the completed pre-war and the first 15 post-war contests, through 1960. Only England and Scotland were winners in the 56 renditions before year 2000, including England–Scotland ties in 1961, 1972 and 1973. Ireland first won in 2000 and won four straight beginning 2005. Wales won its first Camrose in 2011, but now England are again dominant, winning nine times in the last eleven years. The 2022 contest was won by England.

Winners by nation
The competition has been completed 79 times up to 2022. There was an outright winner on each occasion except for 1961, 1972 and 1973, when England and Scotland tied for first place. England's count includes a wins in 2009 and in 2019 by its second team, "English Bridge Union".

Winners by year
Three times recently (*), the winners have been one of two entries from their countries, namely "Ireland" 2008, "EBU" 2009 (English Bridge Union), and "Wales" 2011. They were the defending champion team, the England "B" team, and the Wales "A" team respectively. Their compatriots were "Hosts Ireland", "England", and "WBU" (Welsh Bridge Union).

The 1939 contest was not completed and the next six did not take place because of World War II.

Players
 competition in bridge requires a minimum of four players on each team; up to two additional players may be added as alternates. Two tables are in play at the same time with the North–South pair at one table and East–West pair at the other table being teammates.

Camrose matches comprise two sets of 16 deals with player substitutions permitted between sets. Since 2007 the annual event comprises ten matches for each national team; previously there were eight or six matches. All 2011 participants played in 80 to 144 of 160 deals on the second weekend, or five to nine of ten sets (five matches), led by Rex Anderson and David Greenwood who played nine sets for Northern Ireland. Anderson is the career leader with 92 matches played (through 2011).

*Patrick Jourdain also played two matches for Scotland.

Trophies
Trophies are awarded for each match, in addition to the overall trophy.

References

External links
Bridge Great Britain (BGB)
Contract Bridge Association of Ireland (CBAI)
English Bridge Union (EBU)
Northern Ireland Bridge Union (NIBU)
Scottish Bridge Union (SBU)
Welsh Bridge Union (WBU)

Contract bridge zonal competitions
Sport in Ireland
British games